Balint Miklos (born October 3, 1981 in Miercurea Ciuc, Romania) is a Romanian figure skater. He is the 1999-2000 Romanian national bronze medalist and the 2001 national silver medalist.

External links
 
 Balint Miklos home page 

Romanian male single skaters
Living people
Sportspeople from Miercurea Ciuc
1981 births